Brunei competed at the 2017 World Championships in Athletics in London, United Kingdom, 4–13 August 2017.

Results
(q – qualified, NM – no mark, SB – season best)

Men 
Track and road events

Nations at the 2017 World Championships in Athletics
World Championships in Athletics
Brunei at the World Championships in Athletics